Argentine nationality law regulates the manner in which one acquires, or is eligible to acquire, Argentine nationality. Nationality, as used in international law, describes the legal methods by which a person obtains a national identity and formal membership in a nation. Citizenship refers to the relationship between a nation and a national, after membership has been attained.  Argentina recognizes a dual system accepting Jus soli and Jus sanguinis for the acquisition of nationality by birth and allows foreign persons to naturalize.

Birth in Argentina
Any person born in Argentine territory acquires Argentine nationality at birth. A notable exception to this rule is for children of persons in the service of a foreign government, such as foreign diplomats. This rule can be also applied to people born in the Falkland Islands, a disputed territory between Argentina and the United Kingdom.

Nationality by descent
Argentine nationality law follows jus sanguinis; any person over 18 with at least one Argentine parent can opt for Argentine citizenship, and needs only to establish their parentage in front of a federal judge. For a minor child born outside the country, the Argentine parent must present the child's birth certificate before the local Argentine embassy.

Naturalization 
Naturalization is governed by Law 346, modified by laws 16801, 20835, 24533, 24951, 26774 and decree 70/2017. It sets forth very simple requirements:

 be 18 years old or older;
 have been living in Argentina for a minimum of 2 years; and
 apply for naturalization before a federal judge.

Naturalization can be denied if applicants:
 have been in jail for more than 3 years in the last 5 years;
 are under criminal prosecution;
 have an illegitimate source of income. To work without a legal permit is considered an illegitimate source of income for most of the chamber of appeals.

As the naturalization law has existed essentially unchanged since 1869, subject to later modifications, there are many precedents based on which the Supreme Court is able to resolve almost any immigration-related problem. Nationality has been granted to immigrants who were not legally resident, worked without a legal permit, or entered the country illegally and, in exceptional cases, even to immigrants with criminal records.

The continuous two-year residency requirement means that applicants need to make Argentina their home. However, since applicants enjoy the same civil rights as Argentines, including the right to travel, they may leave the country.

For historical reasons, federal courts are still reluctant to recognize the rights of "irregular" immigrants. They usually request the following requirements related to the abolished law 21.795:

Proof of Legal residency
Proof of undertaking Legal work
Spanish-language ability
Birth certificate apostilled and translated by a public notary
Certificate of a clean criminal record from home country
Certificate of a clean criminal record in Argentina
CUIT or CUIL number

Dual nationality

Dual nationality is accepted in Argentina. Some countries have entered into a reciprocity agreement (Chile, Colombia, Ecuador, El Salvador, Spain, United States until 20 October 1981, Honduras, Italy, Nicaragua, Norway, Panama, and Sweden); Argentine citizens who have been naturalised as citizens of one of these countries enter Argentina with documents of and as citizens of their other nationality and are considered to be such, unless they intend to remain permanently in the country.

Argentine citizens who are also citizens of non-reciprocity countries (e.g., by naturalisation to another citizenship) are recognised only as Argentine citizens within Argentine territory, and would normally enter and leave with their Argentine passport. They can enter, and leave within 180 days, using the travel documents of their other nationality, but if they invoke Argentine nationality they must present their Argentine identity document. After staying more than 180 days they can only leave using their Argentine passport. It is also possible not to mention Argentine citizenship, and enter and leave as a foreign national so long as travel documents do not state place of birth or residence being Argentina.

Despite the rules, it is reported by travellers that there are often difficulties as immigration officials may not be familiar with the rules, and hostility. Two knowledgeable immigration officials have explained the rules as they apply them in a useful discussion. In case of difficulty when travelling without an Argentine passport there is an express passport supply service (with long opening hours) available at airports at additional cost on presenting the Argentine identity document; the process is stated to take 15 minutes, and the passport to be ready in 2 to 6 hours.

Deprivation of nationality
Unlike most other countries, Argentine nationality cannot be renounced and can only be revoked if it was obtained through criminal means, such as fraudulent documentation.

Consequently an Argentine national may not be able to acquire the nationality of a country that requires renunciation of other national identities; however, many countries waive this requirement if renouncing the other nationality is impossible.

History
The first successful attempt to adopt an Argentine Constitution occurred in 1853. It established in Article 15 that slavery was abolished, in Article 16 that all inhabitants were equal under the law, and in Article 20 that foreigners living in the country should have the same civil rights as citizens and were eligible for naturalization after residing in Argentina for two years. The constitution established that nationality could be gained or lost, as was described in civil law. As early as 1867, the Supreme Court confirmed that a married woman shared her husband's nationality. In a case involving Elena Eyras, an Argentine, and her husband Manuel Pedro de la Peña, a Paraguayan, the husband argued their separate nationalities warranted a decision in federal court. The court refused to hear their marital dispute, denying federal jurisdiction on the grounds that married women were required to have a unified identity and share the same domicile as their husbands.

Law 346 of 8 October 1869, the first Argentine nationality law, established in Article 1 that birth in Argentina was the basis for nationality of a child regardless of its parents' nationality, unless the parents were foreign ministers or diplomats residing in the country. The law also established that a child born abroad to a national of the country of either sex could derive nationality from its parent by following procedures for the declaration of Argentine nationality. It contained no specific provisions relating to the loss of citizenship, but the Supreme Court ruled in eleven separate cases between 1867 and 1902 that an Argentine woman who married a foreigner lost her nationality. Likewise, a foreign woman married to an Argentine man gained his nationality. The Argentine Civil Code, adopted in 1869, followed Catholic canon law, establishing a husband's authority over his family and incapacitating married women. A ruling in 1902 from the Supreme Court found that the act of marriage was not responsible for either acquisition or loss of nationality for a woman, but that it could expatriate her for jurisdictional purposes in legal matters, reinforcing that a wife was required to follow her husband's authority.

From 1914, a married woman, foreign or Argentine, did not derive nationality from her husband's. In that year, the Minister of Foreign Affairs instructed consuls abroad to register Argentine women living abroad and married to foreigners as Argentine nationals and to enter foreign wives of Argentine men into the consulate registries without stating they had Argentine nationality. From 1918, the Ministry of Foreign Affairs instructed that foreign wives could receive Argentine passports, though they were not technically nationals, but had the same civil status as the husband. In 1926, Argentina revised its Civil Code through Law 11.357 removing the marital authority provision for husbands and expanding women's civil rights. According to the Federal Chamber in Buenos Aires, until the code revision a married woman had technically lost her nationality, but after the change her nationality was independent of her husband's. In 1933, the Argentine delegation to the Pan-American Union's Montevideo conference signed the Inter-American Convention on the Nationality of Women, which became effective in 1934, without legal reservations. In 1947, the Minister of Foreign Affairs issued another circular reiterating that marriage neither bestowed nor relinquished nationalization for a spouse, but that foreign wives could be issued Argentine passports.

Bibliography

Notes

References

External links
 Ley n° 21.795 (abolished, promulgated May 1978) on Infoleg  

Nationality law
Argentine legislation